Playtonic Games is a British independent video game developer. It was founded in 2014 and it consists in large part of former members of Rare.

History
Playtonic Games was founded in late 2014 by Steve Hurst, Steve Mayles, Gavin Price, Jens Restemeier, Mark Stevenson, and Chris Sutherland, all of whom previously worked at Rare. Of the founders, Price assumed the role of studio head. They were joined by Grant Kirkhope and Steven Hurst. The first game the company worked on was codenamed "Project Ukulele", which was described as a spiritual successor to Banjo-Kazooie. The team launched a Kickstarter campaign for the project, and it managed to reach the stretch goal of US$1 million within 24 hours. In part due to the campaign's success, the team's attention was often diverted to other aspects such as making merchandise items instead of focusing on game's development, and some choices related to game development were forced as well due to them being promised in the campaign. 

Project Ukulele was unveiled as the 3D platformer Yooka-Laylee, which was released in 2017 to mixed critical reviews. Playtonic followed up on Yooka-Laylee with Yooka-Laylee and the Impossible Lair, their second game, a 2.5D spinoff. While bearing similarities with the Donkey Kong Country series, the team opted not to use the moniker "spiritual successor" to market the game, unlike with Yooka-Laylee. Yooka-Laylee and the Impossible Lair was released in 2019 to a more positive reception than Yooka-Laylee.

Playtonic Games announced the rebranding of their company name to "Playtonic" and the launch of a publishing division, Playtonic Friends, in February 2021, with three titles under development from partner studios Awe Interactive, Fabraz, and Okidokico. On 26 March 2021, Playtonic Friends' revealed their first game, Demon Turf, developed by Fabraz. On 29 April 2021, Playtonic Friends's announced their next game, BPM: Bullets Per Minute, would be released in 2021 for PlayStation 4 and Xbox One. On 19 May 2021, Playtonic announced A Little Golf Journey, to be released on PCs and Nintendo Switch and developed by Okidokico.

Tencent acquired a minority stake in Playtonic in November 2021.

Games developed

Games published as Playtonic Friends

References

External links
 

British companies established in 2014
Video game companies established in 2014
Video game development companies
Video game companies of the United Kingdom
2014 establishments in England
Companies based in Derby
Tencent